The Filmfare Award for Best Film – Telugu is given by the Filmfare magazine as part of its annual Filmfare Awards South for Telugu films. The award was first given in 1964 for films released around 1963. Here is a list of the award winners and the films for which they won.

Winners 

Before 2000 year there have no nominations for Filmfare Awards South in Telugu films. The panel of judges, jury members are selected for Best films.

2000s
2001: Nuvvu Nenu
Kushi
Murari
2002: Santosham
Indra
Jayam
Manmadhudu
2003: Okkadu
Aithe
Amma Nanna O Tamila Ammayi
Vasantam
2004: Varsham
Aa Naluguru
Anand
Arya
2005: Nuvvostanante Nenoddantana
Athadu
Chhatrapati
Sankranti
Super
2006: Bommarillu
Godavari
Pokiri
Sri Ramadasu
2007: Happy Days
Desamuduru
Dhee
Tulasi
Yamadonga
2008: Gamyam
Ashta Chamma
Jalsa
Kotha Bangaru Lokam
Parugu
Ready
2009: Magadheera
Arundhati
Arya 2
Kick
Konchem Ishtam Konchem Kashtam

2010s
2010: Vedam
Adhurs
Brindavanam
Leader
Simha
Ye Maaya Chesave
2011: Dookudu
100% Love
Mr. Perfect
Rajanna
Sri Rama Rajyam
2012: Eega
Businessman
Gabbar Singh
Julayi
Racha
 2013: Attarintiki Daredi
Gunde Jaari Gallanthayyinde
Mirchi
Seethamma Vakitlo Sirimalle Chettu
Uyyala Jampala
2014: Manam
Drushyam
Karthikeya
Race Gurram
Run Raja Run
2015: Baahubali: The Beginning
Bhale Bhale Magadivoy
Kanche
Malli Malli Idi Rani Roju
Srimanthudu
2016: Pelli Choopulu
A Aa
Dhruva
Kshanam
Nannaku Prematho
Oopiri
2017: Baahubali 2: The Conclusion
Arjun Reddy
Fidaa
Gautamiputra Satakarni
Ghazi
Sathamanam Bhavati
2018: Mahanati
Bharat Ane Nenu
C/o Kancharapalem
Geetha Govindam
Rangasthalam
Sammohanam

2020s
 2020–2021: Pushpa: The Rise
 Akhanda
 Ala Vaikunthapurramuloo
 Jathi Ratnalu
 Love Story
 Palasa 1978
 Uppena

References

Notes 
 
 
 

Filmfare Awards South (Telugu)